Austin William Patrick Hayes (15 July 1958 – 3 December 1986) was an English-born professional footballer of Irish descent, who played once as a full international for the Republic of Ireland national team in 1979, the same year that he collected a Football League Cup runners-up medal with Southampton.

Career
Hayes was born in Hammersmith, London, one of four children.

Hayes began his professional career as a left winger at Southampton in 1976. He scored twice on his debut in a European Cup Winners' Cup tie at home to Carrick Rangers on 3 November 1976. He played in the 1979 League Cup final but Southampton lost to Nottingham Forest. During that season he had played in 15 First Division games and scored three goals. He made his solitary appearance for Republic of Ireland in a 2–0 victory over Denmark at Lansdowne Road on 2 May 1979.

Hayes was never able to cement a regular first-team place, with players of the calibre of Kevin Keegan, Charlie George and Phil Boyer also in the Saints squad. His last appearance for Southampton came on 3 May 1980 and he was transferred to Millwall for £50,000 in February 1981, later turning out for Northampton Town and then for Barnet in the Gola League.

His last club was Swedish side Friska Viljor.

In December 1986, Austin Hayes died at the age of 28 from lung cancer after contracting pneumonia, just three weeks after the illness was diagnosed. Earlier that year he had spent a short time playing in Sweden and had recently returned to England when he became ill.

Honours
Southampton
League Cup runners-up: 1979

References

External links
Republic of Ireland profile
Austin Hayes in 'Soccer Players' file at Limerick City Library, Ireland
NASL Record

1958 births
1986 deaths
Association football wingers
Republic of Ireland association footballers
Southampton F.C. players
Millwall F.C. players
Footballers from Hammersmith
Deaths from lung cancer
Republic of Ireland international footballers
Republic of Ireland under-21 international footballers
Northampton Town F.C. players
Barnet F.C. players
Los Angeles Aztecs players
English Football League players
North American Soccer League (1968–1984) players